USS Ling (hull number SS-297) is a Balao-class submarine of the United States Navy, named for the ling fish, also known as the cobia. The vessel was built during World War II, but was completed in the final months of the conflict and so saw no action. She was placed in reserve in 1946 until being converted into a training ship in 1960. In 1971, she was struck from the naval register and donated to the Submarine Memorial Association for use as a museum ship. The ship was grounded in the Hackensack River at the former location of the defunct New Jersey Naval Museum in Hackensack, New Jersey. Since 2016, Ling has been inaccessible to the public.

History
Ling was laid down 2 November 1942 by the Cramp Shipbuilding Company of Philadelphia. She was launched 15 August 1943, sponsored by Mrs. E. J. Foy, and was moved to the Boston Navy Yard for completion and testing. Ling was commissioned on 8 June 1945.

After shakedown and further installations, Ling headed out to sea to test her equipment 15 September 1945. The submarine was based at Naval Submarine Base New London in Connecticut until she sailed 11 February 1946 for the Panama Canal Zone, arriving eight days later. She operated out of Panama until 9 March when she sailed north. She completed inactivation 23 October at New London, decommissioned 26 October 1946, and entered the Atlantic Reserve Fleet.

In March 1960, Ling was towed to Brooklyn, New York, where she was converted into a training ship at the Brooklyn Navy Yard, simulating all aspects of submarine operations. She was reclassified an Auxiliary Submarine (with the hull number AGSS-297) in 1962.

Ling received one battle star for World War II service. Ling was reclassified a Miscellaneous Unclassified Submarine (with the hull number IXSS-297), and struck from the Naval Register, 1 December 1971.

Museum ship

Six months later the old 297 was donated to the Submarine Memorial Association, a non-profit organization formed in 1972 with the purpose of saving Ling from the scrap yard. They petitioned the Navy to bring the boat to Hackensack, New Jersey to serve as a memorial "to perpetuate the memory of our shipmates who gave their lives in the pursuit of their duties while serving their country." Many citizens and corporations contributed time, professional services, and funds toward the restoration of Ling. She arrived at her present home in New Jersey in January 1973, where she was restored to near-mint condition—scrubbed, painted, and polished for public tours—through the efforts of the association. The compartments were refurbished and outfitted with authentic gear that recreated the bygone era of the World War II battle submarine. She was the centerpiece of the New Jersey Naval Museum at 78 River St., Hackensack, New Jersey.

X-rays showed that the submarine's five safes contained documents and metallic objects, but the combinations had long been lost. On 27 January 2006, Jeff Sitar, the eight-time world champion locksmith, opened the safes using only his fingers and an electronic sound amplifier, rather than drills or explosives. In the safes, he found a wide variety of objects, including a dozen pennies, two .45-caliber bullets, a ring of keys, many training and maintenance manuals and parts catalogs from the 1940s and 1950s, and two  cans of 190-proof ethanol.

In the American-produced Russian language film Katya shot in 2010, the Ling was used for a set to depict the Soviet K-129 diesel-electric powered submarine which sank on 8 March 1968 northwest of Oahu.

Site
From 1972 until the closing of the New Jersey Naval Museum, the Museum had paid one dollar per year to rent its riverside site for Ling. In January 2007, the North Jersey Media Group, owner of the site, informed the museum that the site was going to be sold for redevelopment within the year and that the museum and submarine would need to be relocated. As of September 2013 the museum itself was closed due to damage in 2012 from Hurricane Sandy. The museum closed again for emergency repairs in late July, 2015. The museum was expected to vacate the property in August 2018. In August 2018, the Ling was vandalized. Locks were cut on interior doors, and hatches were opened, allowing up to 14 ft of water to flood the interior of the ship. Memorial plaques were also stolen from a US Submarine Service memorial on the shore, but were later found to be on the property of one of the Museum personnel, who claimed that he had removed the plaques for 'safekeeping.' The USS Ling is being worked on by a new group of volunteers, who pumped out the water and used compressed air to fill the ship's ballast tanks, allowing her to be refloated. Her final destination has yet to be determined as the original plans have fallen through. There are no plans to allow the USS Ling to be scrapped or to be allowed to deteriorate further and efforts are being made to find a new home for her, potentially in Louisville, KY. The swing bridge south of her on the river is functional and is no longer an obstacle to moving her. In September 2020 volunteers associated with the Louisville Naval Museum began to raise concerns on social media about improper accounting of donations made to the Louisville Naval Museum. The volunteers ceased working with the Louisville Naval Museum after one of the volunteers suffered a serious injury while working aboard the USS Ling in November 2020. The injured volunteer was subsequently awarded a default judgement of $468,584 in a suit against the Louisville Naval Museum.

Freshwater flow in the Hackensack River has been drastically reduced for use as drinking water by the Oradell Dam. The navigable ship channel on the river has only been maintained as far north as the Riverbend in Hudson County. The accumulation of silt has effectively filled in the formerly navigable channel.  The present depth of the Hackensack River is too shallow to allow the Ling to move downstream, and there are no funds or plans to dredge the river, the muds of which are laced with industrial toxins.  The Ling therefore cannot be moved from her location.

There are four bridges across the Hackensack River, south of the Ling, that do not open or move.  Two are vehicular bridges.  Two are rail bridges, one operated by New Jersey Transit and one operated by both New Jersey Transit and Amtrak. These bridges also make moving the submarine downriver impossible.

See also 
 National Register of Historic Places listings in Bergen County, New Jersey

References

External links 
 Tour through the USS Ling inside and out by Weird NJ magazine

  Louisville Naval Museum, Inc.

Balao-class submarines
World War II submarines of the United States
Ships built by William Cramp & Sons
1943 ships
Hackensack, New Jersey
Hackensack River
Museum ships in New Jersey
Monuments and memorials on the National Register of Historic Places in New Jersey
Museums in Bergen County, New Jersey
National Register of Historic Places in Bergen County, New Jersey
New Jersey Register of Historic Places